Protection is the tenth studio album by American punk rock band Face to Face, released on March 4, 2016, through Fat Wreck Chords. It was issued with the catalog number FAT954 on multiple formats including compact disc, vinyl and digital download. This was the first release for the band on Fat Wreck Chords in over 20 years, and the first one with guitarist Dennis Hill as the replacement of Chad Yaro.

The album was recorded at The Blasting Room in Fort Collins, Colorado and produced by Bill Stevenson and Jason Livermore.

Track listing
 "Bent But Not Broken" – 2:30
 "I Won't Say I'm Sorry" – 3:27
 "Double Crossed" – 2:49
 "See If I Care" – 3:25
 "Say What You Want" – 2:52
 "Protection" – 2:57
 "Fourteen Fifty-Nine" – 2:59
 "It Almost All Went Wrong" – 2:57
 "Keep Your Chin Up" – 3:35
 "Middling Around" – 3:00
 "And So It Goes" – 3:38

Personnel
 Trever Keith - lead vocals, guitar
 Scott Shiflett - bass, backing vocals
 Dennis Hill - guitar, backing vocals
 Danny Thompson - drums, backing vocals

Additional personnel
Bill Stevenson - producer, engineer 
Jason Livermore - producer, engineer, mixer
Andrew Berlin - engineer, additional production
Chris Beeble- engineer
Joe Gastwirt - mastering

References

2016 albums
Face to Face (punk band) albums
Fat Wreck Chords albums
Albums produced by Bill Stevenson (musician)